Cosmocampus brachycephalus (American crested pipefish) is a species of marine fish of the family Syngnathidae. It is found in the western Atlantic Ocean, near southern Florida (USA), the Bahamas, and northern South America. This species ovoviviparous, with males carrying eggs and giving birth to live young.

Identifying Features

This species can be distinguished by its prominent crest on top of its head, as well as its black stripes.

References

brachycephalus
Marine fish
Taxa named by Felipe Poey
Fish described in 1868